Narayanpur is a community development block that forms an administrative division in Darbhanga district, Bihar state, India.

Narayanpur is a village with a population of 2,655 as per 2011 census, Narayanpur is a village it is rapidly developing like a town.

Urdu is the local language in the Narayanpur area. Maithili is also spoken by a considerable number of people.  Hindi is also spoken in the region. There is also a local unknown(mixture of Maithili and Urdu ) language is being spoken by the Muslim community.

Geography
The climate of this region is moderate climate .local winds like loo blow in a summer. There are two ponds which are locally called Daiwali pokhar (pond) located in west direction while Dalaukhar (pond) is in the east direction. There is balanced ecosystem, a series of mango orchids are being planted with different types of species.

Religious place
There are four beautiful mosques, Jama Masjid is one of them where people gather for a Friday prayer. There is also a temple located in the centre of the market which is locally called Bazaar.

Agriculture
Economically peoples are mostly engaged in agricultural activities, farmers have a small land holding where they practice traditional modes of agriculture since land is fertile so all types of crops are being grown but for paddy crops. Farmers are highly dependent on monsoon just because of a lack of availability of means of irrigation.

Schools and colleges
There is one middle school (Maqtab) an Urdu medium and also an old Madrasa (Islamic school), Madrasa Ilahiya are being run by the Government of Bihar and there's many government schools. Apart from the government school there are various private schools including the oldest private School, Sun Flower School, New Doon Public School, and Kidzee International Pre-School.

References

Darbhanga district
Villages in Darbhanga district